The 66th parallel south is a circle of latitude that is 66 degrees south of the Earth's equatorial plane, about 61 km north of the Antarctic Circle. It crosses the Southern Ocean and Antarctica.

At this latitude the sun rises on December 13 and does not set again until December 30.

Around the world
Starting at the Prime Meridian and heading eastwards, the parallel 66° south passes through:

{| class="wikitable plainrowheaders"
! scope="col" width="125" | Co-ordinates
! scope="col" | Continent or ocean
! scope="col" | Notes
|-
| style="background:#b0e0e6;" | 
! scope="row" style="background:#b0e0e6;" rowspan="2" | Southern Ocean
| style="background:#b0e0e6;" | South of the Atlantic Ocean
|-
| style="background:#b0e0e6;" | 
| style="background:#b0e0e6;" | South of the Indian Ocean
|-
| 
! scope="row" | Antarctica
| Enderby Land, territory claimed by 
|-
| style="background:#b0e0e6;" | 
! scope="row" style="background:#b0e0e6;" | Southern Ocean
| style="background:#b0e0e6;" | South of the Indian Ocean
|-
| 
! scope="row" | Antarctica
| Princess Elizabeth Land, territory claimed by 
|-
| style="background:#b0e0e6;" | 
! scope="row" style="background:#b0e0e6;" | Southern Ocean
| style="background:#b0e0e6;" | South of the Indian Ocean
|-
| 
! scope="row" | Antarctica
| Wilhelm II Land, territory claimed by 
|-
| style="background:#b0e0e6;" | 
! scope="row" style="background:#b0e0e6;" | Southern Ocean
| style="background:#b0e0e6;" | South of the Indian Ocean, passing just south of Drygalski Island
|-
| 
! scope="row" | Antarctica
| Queen Mary Land, territory claimed by 
|-
| style="background:#b0e0e6;" | 
! scope="row" style="background:#b0e0e6;" | Southern Ocean
| style="background:#b0e0e6;" | South of the Indian Ocean
|-
| 
! scope="row" | Antarctica
| Wilkes Land, territory claimed by 
|-
| style="background:#b0e0e6;" | 
! scope="row" style="background:#b0e0e6;" | Southern Ocean
| style="background:#b0e0e6;" | South of the Indian Ocean
|-
| 
! scope="row" | Antarctica
| Wilkes Land, territory claimed by 
|-
| style="background:#b0e0e6;" | 
! scope="row" style="background:#b0e0e6;" | Southern Ocean
| style="background:#b0e0e6;" | South of the Indian Ocean
|-
| 
! scope="row" | Antarctica
| Wilkes Land, territory claimed by 
|-
| style="background:#b0e0e6;" | 
! scope="row" style="background:#b0e0e6;" | Southern Ocean
| style="background:#b0e0e6;" | South of the Indian Ocean
|-
| 
! scope="row" | Antarctica
| Wilkes Land, territory claimed by 
|-
| style="background:#b0e0e6;" | 
! scope="row" style="background:#b0e0e6;" rowspan="2" | Southern Ocean
| style="background:#b0e0e6;" | South of the Indian Ocean
|-
| style="background:#b0e0e6;" | 
| style="background:#b0e0e6;" | South of the Pacific Ocean
|-
| 
! scope="row" | Antarctica
|-
| style="background:#b0e0e6;" | 
! scope="row" style="background:#b0e0e6;" | Southern Ocean
| style="background:#b0e0e6;" | South of the Atlantic Ocean
|}

See also
65th parallel south
67th parallel south

References

s66